Chebacco Lake is located in Essex County in eastern Massachusetts, United States, within the borders of Essex and Hamilton. It is the largest of five bodies of water that make up the Chebacco Watershed.

Chebacco Lake is designated as a Great Pond, putting it under state ownership but remaining open to public use.

References

External links
 Salem State report (1998)
 Massachusetts Great Ponds List (2015)

Lakes of Essex County, Massachusetts
Lakes of Massachusetts